Far West Story is a 1952 Australian short film which had a cinematic release.

It was made to promote the Far West Children's Health Scheme.

It starred Muriel Steinbeck and Grant Taylor and was produced by T.O. McCreadie.

Plot
A young girl living on an outback station comes down with polio.

Cast
 Alan Clarke
 Laurie Mathers
 Grant Taylor
 Muriel Steinbeck

References

External links
 Far West Story at National Film and Sound Archive

Australian drama short films
1952 films
1950s English-language films